, son of regent Fusamichi with daughter of Ichijo Fuyuyoshi, was a kugyō or court noble of the Muromachi period (1336–1573) of Japan. He held a regent position kampaku from 1553 to 1554. He adopted his brother Uchimoto as his son.

His Dharma names were Goen Myōji (後円明寺) and Tengaku Gyōshun (天岳行春).

References
 

1529 births
1554 deaths
Fujiwara clan
Ichijō family
Muromachi period Buddhists